Looking for Alibrandi is a 2000 Australian film directed by Kate Woods from a script by Melina Marchetta based on her 1992 novel of the same name. The film is set in 1990s Sydney, New South Wales and features a cast of Australian actors, including Pia Miranda as Josephine Alibrandi, the film's main character; Anthony LaPaglia as her father, Michael Andretti, who left her and her mother before her birth; and Kick Gurry as Josie's love interest, Jacob Coote. The film won the Australian Film Institute Award for Best Film in 2000.

Plot
Looking for Alibrandi begins light-heartedly, and conveys Josie's character through her interactions with friends and family. However, the optimism initially associated with Josie fades as she struggles to cope with her final year of school, including the racist attitude of one girl in particular, Carly Bishop (Leeanna Walsman), the suicide of her crush, John Barton (Matthew Newton), and the meeting with Michael Andretti (Anthony LaPaglia), her absent father, who has only just learned of her existence upon returning to Sydney for work. She is also in continual conflict with her grandmother, Katia Alibrandi (Elena Cotta).

However, these complications are seemingly resolved quickly, in keeping with Josie's brusque and forthright outlook on life. For example, in response to Carly's frequent snide remarks, she breaks her tormentor's nose with a history textbook. It is this drastic act that brings her father back into her life.

Another complication—the suicide of her close friend, John Barton—tests her resilience. Struggling with her grief, she finds some comfort from Jacob Coote. An apparent 'bad boy', he turns out to be a sincere and caring person.

The most significant complication and challenge for Josie, is her rocky relationship with her Nonna. When they finally get to know each other, and recognise themselves in each other, their rift heals, and she can confide in her.

Production
The world premiere of the play Looking for Alibrandi, based on the novel, was created and performed by the PACT Youth Theatre in 1995. It sold out for three seasons, leading to the making of a film adaptation.

The film was produced by Robyn Kershaw.

The entire film was filmed in Sydney, including such locations as Glebe (Alibrandi's house), Bondi Beach, Sydney Central Station on Eddy Avenue, the Concert Hall Northern Foyer, and entrance of Sydney Opera House (the Have your Say Day scene), George Street/Anzac Bridge (the scene where Jacob Coote sent Josephine Alibrandi home with his motorcycle), the Scots College and Kincoppal School were also used throughout the film, the main quadrangle of University of Sydney (the John Barton and Josephine Alibrandi scene), Village Cinema (Jacob and Josie's date) and Oporto (where Josie works part-time).

Critical acclaim
The film, while not well known in international markets, has received critical acclaim for its insights into both the second-generation-migrant experience and the universal human condition.

Looking for Alibrandi was Kate Woods' directorial debut in film; Woods was acclaimed for "giving [the film's] multicultural terrain the true respect and depth it deserves."

Awards
Looking for Alibrandi won five awards at the 2000 AFI Awards:

Best Film–presented to producer Robyn Kershaw
Best Lead Actress–Pia Miranda
Best Supporting Actress–Greta Scacchi
Best Adapted Screenplay–Melina Marchetta (adapted from her own novel)
Best Film Editing–Martin Connor

Box office
Looking for Alibrandi grossed $8,300,000 at the box office in Australia.

See also
 Cinema of Australia
 Sydney in film

References

External links

Looking for Alibrandi on australianscreen online
Looking for Alibrandi at Oz Movies
Looking for Alibrandi at the National Film and Sound Archive

2000 films
2000s coming-of-age drama films
Australian coming-of-age drama films
Films based on Australian novels
Films shot in Sydney
Films set in Sydney
Italian-Australian culture
Films scored by Alan John
2000 directorial debut films
2000 drama films